James Ferraro (born November 6, 1986) is an American experimental musician, producer, composer and contemporary artist. He has been credited as a pioneer of the 21st century genres hypnagogic pop and vaporwave, with his work exploring themes related to hyperreality and consumer culture. His music has drawn on diverse styles such as 1980s electronic music, easy listening, drone, lo-fi, sound collage, and R&B.

Ferraro began his career in the early 2000s as a member of the Californian noise duo The Skaters, after which he began recording solo work under his name and a wide variety of aliases. He released projects on labels such as Hippos in Tanks and New Age Tapes. Ferraro received wider recognition when his polarizing 2011 album Far Side Virtual was chosen as Album of the Year by The Wire.

Biography

Early life and The Skaters
Ferraro was born in Rochester, New York to Italian and African-American parents. He came from a musical background; his father was a musician, DJ, and record enthusiast while his mother was a singer. He began making instrumentals in high school with the program MTV Music Generator (1999). When Ferraro was 18, he moved from New York to San Diego, California, where he met Spencer Clark. He explained that "we had this conversation and it ended with us collaborating on visual art and paintings and stuff together."

When Ferraro was 20, he formed a drone noise music project with Clark called The Skaters and the two recorded music for a year under the moniker. After a year of recording, they began touring around the country and issued releases from that year of recording. Physicalities Of The Sensibilities Of Ingrediential Stairways (2008), issued on Eclipse Records, was the last record released by the Skaters.

Solo career
Ferraro started the label New Age Tapes to release his own solo work; his early solo material was often released under myriad pseudonyms such as Lamborghini Crystal and Teotihuacan, and was often distributed as limited cassette or CD-Rs, although some LPs, such as Clear (2008) and Last American Hero (2008) on labels such as Holy Mountain Records and Olde English Spelling Bee. According to AllMusic's Paul Simpson, these early recordings "explored everything from gamelan to drone to lo-fi Casio pop," and were associated with the 2000s "hypnagogic pop" trend by the media. Around 2010, Ferraro's music developed an eccentric pop style on releases such as the high-school themed Night Dolls with Hairspray (2010). He also collaborated on the 2011 RVNG ambient album collaboration FRKWYS 7 with Daniel Lopatin, David Borden, Laurel Halo, and Sam Godin.

With the release of his polarizing 2011 album Far Side Virtual  on Hippos in Tanks, Ferraro's work abruptly embraced MIDI music technology and corporate Muzak. Beginning as a series of ringtones, the album was met with both praise and derision from critics, and was named Album of the Year by UK experimental magazine The Wire; it was interpreted as "providing a postmodern critique on consumer culture, retro-futurism, and hyperreality," and along with Lopatin's Chuck Person's Eccojams Vol. 1 would go on to influence the 2010s Internet genre vaporwave, which explored similar themes. Following the release of Far Side Virtual, Ferraro's work became increasingly influenced by contemporary hip hop and R&B, as evidenced on albums such as Sushi (2012), NYC, Hell 3:00 AM (2013), and Skid Row (2015). He also released digital downloads under aliases such as  Bebetune$ and Bodyguard. His 2016 album Human Story 3 returned to themes explored on Far Side Virtual.

In August 2017, Ferraro's multimedia art exhibition Extinction Renaissance premiered at the Loyal Gallery in Stockholm, Sweden. Ferraro also released a limited edition musical piece, 'Anthrospray: Music for Extinction Renaissance', on USB credit cards through the Loyal Gallery's website. On November 26th, 2017, Ferraro digitally released Troll, a five-track EP. In February 2018, Ferraro officially premiered Plague, an opera with scenography by Nate Boyce, at the 2018 transmediale festival. The work starred German actor Christoph Schüchner as an "undead" Steve Jobs, "the surrogate of a deranged AI, a data mongrel  all our networked activity", and also featured chorales by PHØNIX16. On May 18, 2018, Ferraro digitally released Four Pieces for Mirai, an EP working as the first part of and the prologue to the ongoing 'body of work' and project of the same name. Ferraro was featured and interviewed on the 416th cover of The Wire, October 2018.

Artistry
Ferraro has created music since the mid-2000s, initially with Spencer Clark as The Skaters. His style has ranged from drone music and noise music with a lo-fi ethos to sound collages. His works are known for being conceptual in nature and for uniquely expressing specific modern subjects; his albums have incorporated themes of consumerism, cybernetics, emaciation, social experience, hyperreality, post-9/11 New York, lo-fi counterculture, and the collapse of civilization. His 2011 work Far Side Virtual is often credited for helping to spark the development of the internet-based micro-genre vaporwave, although he has not considered himself a part of its history.

In a 2009 issue of The Wire, David Keenan characterized Ferraro as an progenitor of an emerging post-noise music style dubbed "hypnagogic pop", in which memory and nostalgia for retro formats (especially 1980s recording technology and culture) acted as a defining characteristic.

Red Bull Music Academy described the concept of Ferraro's albums as regarding the "dark underbelly of masculine culture in the digital age." Most of Ferraro's records take place in dystopian environments, focusing on the consequences of consumerism. According to Ferraro, the consumerism concept of his albums came from his interest in "signs" and "symbols" and the fact that they lose their identity due to "excessive repetition." His works have been compared to theories of French sociologist Jean Baudrillard, who stated that only "symbols" and "signs" have destroyed any sort of real meaning and that human activity is "only a simulation of reality."

The sounds Ferraro uses are those that humans encounter but are not aware of. These include television jingles, cell phone ringtones and ATM noises. Robert Grunenberg of Ssense characterized the sounds as "communicational tools" between humans and electronics that are "informing, warning, or pleasing" humans. He also writes that "the shelf life of electronic audio rarely surpasses that of your average milk carton. And so, his compilations become a nostalgic sound archive of the near-past." Overall, Grunenberg analyzed that concepts of Ferraro's sound palette was that "as much as we are living under the dominance of our visual culture, we are greatly affected by the powers of our audio culture as well." Ferraro symbolized the nostalgia element that comes out of these "near-past" sounds as "the decline of American prosperity, a ghost of a once-superpower that is dying." In making an album, Ferraro says that he comes up with a "vision" or an imaginary visual picture of what it will be. He explained in a 2012 interview, "I try not to be overly conceptual about what I’m doing. You can contrive it to a point where it gets too heady. Music wise, I try to be careful." When interviewed by Bomb magazine on the subject of sampling in 2013, Ferraro said, "I sample my own sources of sounds. I use AT&T Natural Voices and text-to-speech generators so it's all original content."

Partial discography
Multitopia (2008, New Age Tapes)
Clear (2008, New Age Tapes)
Discovery (2008, New Age Tapes)
Postremo Mundus Techno-Symposium (2008, New Age Tapes)
Marble Surf (2008, New Age Tapes)
Chameleon Ballet (as K2) (2008, New Age Tapes)
Last American Hero (2008, Taped Sounds)
Heaven's Gate (2009, New Age Tapes)
KFC City 3099: Pt.1 Toxic Spill (2009, New Age Tapes)
Wild World (2009, Muscleworks Inc.)
Citrac (2009, Arbor)
iAsia (2009, Muscleworks Inc.)
On Air (2009, Muscleworks Inc.)
Night Dolls with Hairspray (2010, Olde English Spelling Bee)
Condo Pets (2011, Hippos in Tanks)
Far Side Virtual (2011, Hippos in Tanks)
Inhale C-4 $$$$$ (as Bebetune$) (2011, b3BETUNES)
Silica Gel  (as Bodyguard) (2012, self-released)
Sushi (2012, Hippos in Tanks)
Cold (2013, Hippos in Tanks)
NYC, Hell 3:00 AM (2013, Hippos in Tanks) 
Suki Girlz (as User703918785) (2014, self-released)
War (2015, self-released)
Skid Row (2015, Break World)
Human Story 3 (2016, self-released)
Rerex (2016, Aguirre Records)
Burning Prius ® (2016, self-released)
Fanfare for the Boston Marathon 2017 (2017, self-released)
Anthrospray: Music for Extinction Renaissance (2017, LOYAL)
Troll (2017, self-released)
Four Pieces for Mirai (2018, self-released)
Requiem for Recycled Earth (2019, self-released)
Neurogeist (2020, self-released)
Terminus (2021, self-released)
They Dont Know Its Christmas (2021, self-released)

References

External links
Avatar Island, the precursor to Far Side Virtual, on Internet Archive

African-American musicians
American people of Italian descent
Ambient musicians
American electronic musicians
American experimental musicians
1986 births
Living people
Musicians from Rochester, New York
Vaporwave musicians
Hypnagogic pop musicians
American contemporary artists
African-American composers
African-American male composers